Lee Young-min (1 December 1905 – 12 August 1954) was a South Korean versatile sportsman who played in football, baseball and athletics.

Early life
Lee's birthplace wasn't precisely known, but it is being assumed that Chilgok or Yecheon. When Lee became a student of Paichai High School, located in Keijō (the former name of Seoul, and also known as Gyeongseong or Kyungsung in Korean), he played as an athlete of his school in football, baseball and athletics. He won a high school competition of the Gyeongin Ekiden Championship and a high school division of the All Joseon Football Tournament with his team.

Playing career
Lee's school Yonhi College participated in the senior division of All Joseon Football Tournament since 1927, and he won the 1927 and 1928 tournament.

In 1928, Lee won five titles at an All Joseon Athletics Games, and especially in the 400 m sprint, he set a new competition record. In the same year, he also hit the Korean first official home run in a baseball match against Gyeongseong Medical College.

In 1929, Lee became the only Korean in the baseball club of Chōsen Shokusan Bank by joining the club after his graduation, and started to play in the Intercity baseball tournament (Japanese national competition) and the Chōsen Semi-professional Baseball League.

Lee also participated as a player of Gyeongseong's football team in the football series between Gyeongseong and Pyongyang since 1930, and played for Kyungsung FC after it was formally founded.

In 1933, Lee helped to found the Joseon Football Association, currently Korea Football Association. In the same year, he participated in the Intercity Tournament with Zenkeijō, the selection of Japanese Baseball players who were living in Gyeongseong including Shokusan Bank players, and led his team to finish as runners-up.

In November 1934, Lee was selected for the Japanese Baseball All-Star Team, and also played games against American All-Star Team who visited Japan. He took a picture with Babe Ruth at that time.

In 1935, Lee took on both roles player and manager of Kyungsung FC in the Japanese FA cup Emperor's Cup, and won the title.

Managerial career
Lee became the first manager who managed South Korea national football team at an international competition by participating in the 1948 Summer Olympics. He accomplished South Korean first ever victory in an international football competition against Mexico in the first round of the tournament.

Death and legacy
Lee led a promiscuous life and was unconcerned with his family. On 12 August 1954, Lee's third son In-seop, who had run away from home, returned home to try a burglary with his friends, but one of In-seop's friends killed Lee during the burglary.

Football honours 
Yonhi College
All Joseon Football Tournament: 1927, 1928

Yeonu Gurakbu
All Joseon Football Tournament runner-up: 1929

Gyerim FC
All Joseon Football Tournament runner-up: 1932

Kyungsung FC
All Joseon Football Tournament runner-up: 1933
Emperor's Cup: 1935
Chōsen Shrine Games: 1935
Meiji Shrine Games: 1935

References

External links

1905 births
1954 deaths
South Korean footballers
South Korean baseball players
South Korean football managers
Kyungsung FC players
Association footballers not categorized by position
Sportspeople from North Gyeongsang Province
South Korea national football team managers